Loïc Gasch (born 13 August 1994) is a Swiss high jumper.

He finished tenth at the 2018 European Championships. He also competed at the 2015 European U23 Championships without reaching the final.

His personal best jump was 2.26 metres, achieved in July 2017 in Zürich, before he jumped 2.33 m, new Swiss record at Stade olympique de la Pontaise, Lausanne (SUI) on 8 May 2021.

International competitions

References

1994 births
Living people
Swiss male high jumpers
Athletes (track and field) at the 2020 Summer Olympics
Olympic athletes of Switzerland
World Athletics Indoor Championships medalists